Three ships of the Royal Navy have borne the name HMS St David, after Saint David, patron saint of Wales:

  was a 54-gun fourth rate launched in 1667.  She foundered in 1690, was raised in 1691 and hulked, and finally sold in 1713
 HMS St David is the name given to a number of tenders of the south Wales [Royal Naval Reserve] unit, later HMS Cambria  (shore establishment).
 Motor minesweeper 233 was HMS St David between 1948 and 1956
 HMS Brereton (M1112) was HMS St David between 1954 and 1961
 HMS Crichton (M1124) was HMS St David between 1961 and 1976
 It has been suggested that a 1920s  ultimately not ordered could have been named HMS St David
  was a converted minesweeper launched in 1972 as the commercial trawler Suffolk Monarch. She was converted and commissioned into service as the tender to the South Wales Division RNR in 1978 and was the test-bed for the Deep-Armed Team Sweep (DATS) concept, which eventually saw fruition in the River-class MSF. Following her de-commissioning, she was returned to her original owner in 1983, where she was converted into an oil rig safety/standby vessel.

References
 

Royal Navy ship names